Judith Rebecca Hauptman (born 1943) is an American feminist Talmudic  scholar.

Biography
She grew up in the Brooklyn borough of New York City, New York, United States.

Hauptman received a degree in Talmud from the Seminary College of Jewish Studies at Jewish Theological Seminary, a B.A. in economics from Barnard College, and an M.A. and Ph.D. in Talmudic studies from the Jewish Theological Seminary. She earned her PhD in 1982, and was the first woman to earn a PhD in Talmud, which she earned from the Jewish Theological Seminary in New York.  She also studied at Hebrew University in Jerusalem.

Hauptman was ordained as a rabbi in May 2003 by the Academy for Jewish Religion. She is the E. Billi Ivry Professor of Talmud and Rabbinics at the Jewish Theological Seminary and the Chair of the Department of Talmud and Rabbinics. She has taught at the Jewish Theological Seminary since 1973.  Shortly after her ordination as a rabbi, she founded Ohel Ayalah, an outreach project to disaffected young Jews, named in memory of her mother. Ohel Ayalah runs free, walk-in High Holy Days services and Passover seders for people of all ages on the first night and for twenties and thirties on the second.

Hauptman has written on issues of Talmudic Law and on women's issues in Rabbinic and modern Judaism. Her view is that the ancient rabbis gradually granted women more autonomy and enacted laws that dealt with women in a fairer manner. She was an early member of Ezrat Nashim, a group of women who lobbied in the 1970s for egalitarianism in Jewish life. In 1993, she wrote the article “Women and Prayer: An Attempt to Dispel Some Fallacies,” (JUDAISM, Winter 1993). In it, she argued that Jewish women have always had an obligation to pray and for that reason can count in the minyan and even lead it in prayer.

In 2014, she became the first guest lecturer from abroad to address the Israeli Knesset’s weekly religious study session.

See also
Timeline of women rabbis

References

Bibliography
 Rereading the Rabbis: A Woman's Voice (1987).
 Development of the Talmudic Sugya: Relationship Between Tannaitic and Amoraic Sources (1988).
 "Abortion: Where We Stand" (United Synagogue Review, Spring 1990).
 "Women in the Conservative Synagogue," in Daughters of the King: Women and the Synagogue (Philadelphia: Jewish Publication Society, 1992)
 "A Time to Mourn, A Time to Heal" (Celebration and Renewal, Philadelphia: Jewish Publication Society, 1993).
 "Women and Prayer: An Attempt to Dispel Some Fallacies" (JUDAISM, Winter 1993).  * "Judaism and a Just Economy," (Tikkun, January/February 1994).
 "Conservative Judaism: The Ethical Challenge of Jewish Feminism" (The Americanization of the Jews, New York: New York University Press, 1995).
 "Mishnah as a Response to Tosefta" (The Synoptic Problem in Rabbinic Literature, Shaye J.D. Cohen, Brown Judaic Series, 2000).
 Rereading the Mishnah (Text and Studies in Ancient Judaism 109), Tübingen: Mohr Siebeck (2005).

1943 births
Living people
American Conservative rabbis
People from Brooklyn
Feminist studies scholars
Talmudists
Conservative women rabbis
Conservative Jewish feminists
21st-century American rabbis